Khaling may refer to:
 Khaling language, in Nepal and India
 Khaling people, a Kiranti ethnic group of Nepal
 Khaling, Bhutan, a town
 Khaling Gewog, the administrative unit
 Khaling Wildlife Sanctuary

See also 
 Dibya Khaling, Nepali musician